Floyd Brown (born 8 September 1957) is a retired Jamaican sprinter.

References

1957 births
Living people
Jamaican male sprinters
Commonwealth Games medallists in athletics
Place of birth missing (living people)
Commonwealth Games silver medallists for Jamaica
Commonwealth Games bronze medallists for Jamaica
Athletes (track and field) at the 1978 Commonwealth Games
Athletes (track and field) at the 1979 Pan American Games
Athletes (track and field) at the 1987 Pan American Games
Pan American Games medalists in athletics (track and field)
Pan American Games silver medalists for Jamaica
Central American and Caribbean Games gold medalists for Jamaica
Competitors at the 1978 Central American and Caribbean Games
Central American and Caribbean Games medalists in athletics
Medalists at the 1979 Pan American Games
20th-century Jamaican people
Medallists at the 1978 Commonwealth Games